Independent Television Network Ltd also known as ITN Ltd or simply as ITN is a Sri Lankan state governed television and radio broadcaster located in Wickramasinghepura, Battaramulla, Sri Lanka. It is a Shrama Abhimani Award winner (Oct 2009)
, broadcasts content to a wide demographic within Sri Lanka as well as the expatriate community. The programmes are broadcast in three languages: Sinhala, Tamil, and English. The ITN broadcast coverage extends to 99% of the island of Sri Lanka.

The ITN channel is the flagship television channel of ITN Ltd. ITN further operates three FM radio stations; Lakhanda (Former ITN FM), the Sinhala language service; Vasantham FM, the Tamil language service and Prime Radio, the English language service. Vasantham TV, a second television channel operated by ITN Ltd, broadcasts content in the Tamil language. ITN recently launched a website ITN News, which is an online portal for the distribution of local news internationally.

ITN channel is also the first 1080p full HD television channel in Sri Lanka. The ITN Ltd has invested Rs. 200 Mn on the construction of the country's first HD studio complex and started high resolution broadcasting since 30 June 2016.

History

ITN Ltd commenced operations on 13 April 1979 with the introduction of the TN television channel. As the first television broadcasting service of Sri Lanka and South Asia they began transmission of the first terrestrial television channel in the country.  It was also the first privately owned television station in a region where the government was in control of radio and television.
The founding board of directors was composed of Mr. Shan Wickramasinghe, Mr. Anil Wijewardene and Mr. Bob Christie. Initially the ITN Ltd studios and transmission station were based in Mahalwarawa Estate, Pannipitiya. A single Kilo Watt (1K.W) transmitter and 65 ft. transmission tower were used to broadcast the ITN channel within a fifteen (15) mile radius of the city of Colombo. Due to the geographical location of the transmission station, local weather and the transmission equipment used early viewers experienced many disruptions and interference to programmes as a result of voltage fluctuations.

On 5 June 1979 ITN Ltd was acquired by the state as a business undertaking under a Competent Authority. The duly appointed authority, the late Mr. D. Thevis L. Guruge (ex-Director General of the Sri Lanka Broadcasting Corporation) contributed significantly to the early development of the organisation.
 ITN Ltd was the pioneer of colour television transmission in Sri Lanka. On 5 June 1984 ITN Ltd relocated to its current base of operations in Wickramasinhapura. In 1992 ITN was converted to a public company with the state as the major shareholder of the company. Subsequently, the revenue, the diversity of programmes, technical services and coverage expanded significantly.

Lakhanda and Vasantham FM are two of the three FM radio stations operated by ITN Ltd. The Lakhanda radio station which originated as a subsidiary of the Sri Lanka Broadcasting Corporation (SLBC) was amalgamated with ITN Ltd on 1 April 1997. This radio station broadcasts content in the Sinhala language. Vasantham FM is an FM radio station also operated by ITN Ltd which broadcasts content in the Tamil language. This radio station was launched in June 2009 to fulfill the media requirements of the Tamil speaking community within Sri Lanka.

Furthermore, ITN Ltd commenced transmission of a second television channel, Vasantham TV on 25 June 2009. This particular television channel broadcasts content in the Tamil language. ITN launched Prime TV and Prime Radio, a television channel and radio station that broadcasts material in English on 12 November 2009.

Programmes

ITN Ltd's television channels and radio stations broadcast a variety of different of programmes in Sinhala, Tamil, and English languages. Listed below are some of the programmes broadcast by the television channels and radio stations operated by ITN Ltd.

ITN channel – (Primarily broadcasts content in the Sinhala language)
News – (In Sinhala, Tamil and English)
Teledramas – (Amaa, Ridee Siththam, Muthu Warusa, Tharu Piri Ahasak, Parana Towuma, Emy, Snehaye Dasi, Nethu Piyena Thura, Kopi Kade, Aluth Gedera, Sihina Tharaka, Rantharu, Bonda Meedum )
Films – Classic Sinhala Films
Documentaries – Atapattama
Educational programmes
Children's entertainment
Programmes dubbed in Sinhala
Game shows
Reality TV
Religious programmes
Political debates

Vasantham TV – (Primarily broadcasts content in the Tamil language)
News
Teledramas
Films – Tamil / Hindi Films
Documentaries
Educational programmes 
Children's entertainment

Prime TV – (Primarily broadcasts content in the English language)
News
Music Programmes – (Music Runway, House of Rock, Music With Bevil)
Debates and Discussions – (The Round Table, Ayubowan Sri Lanka, Prime Sunrise)
Educational/Variety Programmes – (Prime Sunset)
Drama – (Beverly Hills 90210, Relic Hunter, Queen of Swords)
Other – (Sports/Foreign News/Cartoons)
Lakhanda – (Primarily broadcasts content in the Sinhala language)
News
Music – Sinhala
Religious programmes
Educational programmes
Political programmes

Vasantham FM – (Primarily broadcasts content in the Tamil language)
News
Music – Tamil
Religious programmes
Educational programmes
Political programmes

Prime Radio – (Primarily broadcasts content in the English language)
News
Music

Frequencies and coverage

Cumulatively, the broadcasts of ITN Ltd reach over 99% of the country. However, the coverage for the individual radio stations and television channels vary considerably.

ITN
Frequency/ies: VHF Ch9, VHF Ch 12, VHF Ch 24
Coverage: 99% of country except certain areas in the North
International coverage: Live online streaming at The ITN Channel Online

Vasantham TV
Frequency/ies:VHF Ch9, UHF 25
Coverage:Western Province, North and East
International coverage: Live online streaming at Vasantham TV Online

Prime TV
Frequency/ies:UHF Ch24
Coverage:Western Province
International coverage: Live online streaming at Prime TV Online

Lakhanda
Frequency/ies + Coverage: 97.6 MHz – Colombo, South / 87.9 MHz – North and 88.5 MHz Islandwide
International coverage: Live online streaming at [https://web.archive.org/web/20061115123501/http://www.lakhanda.lk/ Lakhanda Radio Online

Vasantham FM
Frequency/ies + Coverage: 97.6 MHz – Colombo, 97.0Mhz
International coverage: Live online streaming at Vasantham FM Online

Prime Radio

Frequency/ies + Coverage: 104.5 MHz – Colombo, 95.5 MHz – Kandy, 99.0 MHz – Galle
International coverage: Live online streaming at Prime Radio Onlin]

See also
List of television networks in Sri Lanka
List of radio networks in Sri Lanka
Media of Sri Lanka

References

ITN starts HD broadcasting: Sri Lanka’s first full HD television studio complex will be opened tomorrow, 29 June 2016

External links
Official website of the ITN Channel
ITN FM Radio
Vasantham TV
Vasantham FM Radio
Prime TV Sri Lanka
Prime Radio Sri Lanka
Official Govt. News Portal – ITN News
ITN goes digital

Sinhala-language television stations
 
Television channels and stations established in 1979
1979 establishments in Sri Lanka